Symphony No. 7 is the name given to a four-movement symphony in E major (D 729) drafted by Franz Schubert in August 1821. Although the work (which comprises about 1350 bars) is structurally complete, Schubert only orchestrated the slow introduction and the first 110 bars of the first movement. The rest of the work is continued on 14-stave score pages as a melodic line with occasional basses or counterpoints, giving clues as to changes in orchestral texture.

Schubert seems to have laid the symphony aside in order to work on his opera Alfonso und Estrella, and never returned to it. The manuscript was given by Schubert's brother Ferdinand to Felix Mendelssohn and was subsequently acquired by Sir George Grove, who bequeathed it to the Royal College of Music in London. There are at least four completions: by John Francis Barnett (1881), Felix Weingartner (1934), Brian Newbould (1980), and Richard Dünser (2022). The work is now generally accepted to be Schubert's Seventh Symphony, an appellation which some scholars had preferred to leave for the chimerical 'Gastein Symphony' that was long believed to have been written and lost in 1824, and is now generally identified as the "Great C Major" symphony, No. 9.

The revised Deutsch catalogue and the Neue Schubert-Ausgabe do not number this symphony, preferring to give the number 7 to the Unfinished Symphony. In the complete edition of Breitkopf & Härtel (Franz Schubert's Works), the number 7 is given to the Great C major symphony.

Instrumentation

This symphony is scored for an even larger orchestral force than Schubert's eighth and ninth symphonies. The score calls for double woodwinds, four horns, two trumpets, three trombones, timpani and strings.

Movements

Weingartner completion

Newbould completion

References 
Notes

Sources

Further reading 
 Brian Newbould
 Schubert and the Symphony: a New Perspective [Paperback] (Toccata Press, 1992; paperback reissue 1999),  – Hardback,  – Paperback
 Schubert: the Music and the Man (Gollancz/University of California Press, 1997; paperback reissue 1999), 
 Christopher Howard Gibbs
 The Life of Schubert (Musical Lives) [Paperback], published by Cambridge University Press Paperback (April 28, 2000),

External links 
 

No. 07
Schubert, 07
Schubert 7
1821 compositions
Compositions in E major